Hernâni Infande Tchuda da Silva (born 3 April 2001) is a Bissau-Guinean professional footballer who plays as a winger for Portuguese club Paços de Ferreira on loan from Braga.

Club career
On 20 September 2020, Infande made his senior debut in the third-tier of Portuguese football for Braga B, scoring in a 3–0 win over Bragança. The following year, he made his professional debut for the first team, coming on as a substitute in a defeat to Roma in the Europa League.

On 31 January 2023, Infande joined Paços de Ferreira on loan until the end of the 2022–23 season.

Career statistics

References

External links

2001 births
Sportspeople from Bissau
Bissau-Guinean emigrants to Portugal
Portuguese people of Bissau-Guinean descent
Living people
Bissau-Guinean footballers
Portuguese footballers
Association football wingers
S.C. Braga B players
S.C. Braga players
F.C. Paços de Ferreira players
Primeira Liga players
Campeonato de Portugal (league) players